Malacoctenus macropus, the Rosy blenny, is a species of labrisomid blenny native to the Atlantic Ocean including the Gulf of Mexico and the Caribbean Sea from southern Florida and the Bahamas to the northern coast of South America. This species inhabits a wide range of habitats including patch reefs, seagrass beds and sponge beds. This species can reach a length of  TL. It can also be found in the aquarium trade.

References

External links
 

macropus
Fish of the Caribbean
Fish described in 1868